Bhrigu Nath Singh, also known as B.N. Singh, is an Indian engineering scientist. He is a distinguished professor and Institute's first Dean of Human Resources, Indian Institute of Technology Kharagpur. Chair of the ICTACEM and former Head of Department Aerospace Engineering, IIT Kharagpur.

He is one of the delegates of Aerospace Industry-Academia Conclave, HAL.

Early life and education
Singh got his bachelor's degree in Civil Engineering and Master's in Applied mechanics from Motilal Nehru National Institute of Technology Allahabad India in 1990 & 1992. Existing passion pertaining to Aeronautical Engineering, six years later in 1998, he joined Ph.D. in Aerospace Engineering at IIT Kanpur, received in 2001, later obtained his Post Doctorate Fellowship from Wright State University in 2003.

Career
Prior to joining IIT Kharagpur as an assistant professor in 2004, Singh was a faculty member of MNNIT Allahabad. He has addressed several problems in aerospace structures with particular focus on geometric and material nonlinearity and uncertainty. Singh has over 130 research papers published and has given numerous national and international talks. He has supervised over 15 Ph.D. and 50 MTech students. He has handled several defense projects of the Government of India. He has organized three ICTACEM, an  international conference in which more than 250 delegates from India and abroad attends.

Singh has developed several mathematical models. He has first time introduced a direct iterative based probabilistic procedure for handling highly nonlinear problems, which is still challenging tasks in the research community. He has put forth his knowledge and ideas in some of the highly-rated journals. He has the distinction of getting his paper listed in the most cited paper since 2008 and also of a leading researcher in the field of uncertainty quantification.

Singh is a fellow of  Indian Society for Technical Education India and an elected fellow of the Institute of Engineers (India). He has been listed among top most cited papers in International Journal of Finite Elements in Analysis and Design in 2014. Some of his papers were listed among the most downloaded research papers in International Journal of Mechanical Sciences (2014).

References

Living people
1968 births
Indian aerospace engineers
Wright State University alumni
IIT Kanpur alumni
University of Allahabad alumni
Motilal Nehru National Institute of Technology Allahabad alumni
Fellows of the Indian Society for Technical Education
Academic staff of IIT Kharagpur